NHRP may refer to:
National Hispanic Recognition Program, an American program to identify and highlight outstanding Hispanic high school students
National Hazards Research Platform, a service of the New Zealand Ministry of Business, Innovation and Employment
National Hurricane Research Project, a former United States scientific hurricane research project
National Housing Research Program, a program of the Australian Housing and Urban Research Institute
National Register of Historic Places, a program of the U.S. Government to recognize and document historic objects & places
Next Hop Resolution Protocol, a protocol used to improve the efficiency of routing computer network traffic
Nonhuman Rights Project (NhRP), an organization seeking to extend the legal rights of animals

See also
 NRHP, the U.S. National Register of Historic Places